Carlos Jiménez Villarejo (born 1935 in Málaga) is a former Spanish anti-corruption public prosecutor in office between 2000 and 2004. 
As a left-wing democrat jurist, he is specialized in the struggle against tax havens. He collaborates with ATTAC's struggle to abolish money-laundering center.

In 2014 he briefly represented Podemos in the European Parliament. He stopped working with Podemos in 2016.

References

Bibliography 

 Denis Robert, La justice ou le chaos, Stock, 1996. Interviews and portrait of seven anticorruption judges: Bernard Bertossa, Edmondo Bruti Liberati, Gherardo Colombo, Benoît Dejemeppe, Baltasar Garzon Real, Carlos Jimenez Villarejo, Renaud Van Ruymbeke

1935 births
Living people
People from Málaga
MEPs for Spain 2014–2019
Podemos (Spanish political party) MEPs